Myrtle Agnes Cain (April 11, 1894 – February 6, 1980) was an American politician and labor activist.

Born in Minneapolis, Minnesota to Irish immigrant parents, Cain went to the Minneapolis public schools and to the St. Anthony's Convent. Cain served as president of the Women's Trade Union of Minneapolis and was a member of the Minnesota Farmer Labor Party. In 1923 and 1924, Cain served in the Minnesota House of Representatives. Later, she served on the staff of United States Senator Eugene McCarthy of Minnesota. Cain died in Minneapolis, Minnesota. Governor Wendell Anderson named February 15, 1973 "Myrtle Cain Day."

Union work 
Cain led a strike with the Telephone Operators Union in 1918. She was also a member of the Women's Trade Union League of Minneapolis and the National Woman's Party.

Minnesota House of Representatives 
After the Nineteenth Amendment was ratified and upheld in the 1922 Supreme Court case of Leser v Garnett, Cain and three other women won seats in the Minnesota House of Representatives in the 1922 election. During Cain's single session in office (1923-1924), she co-sponsored a bill about anti-masking, which prevented  KKK members from wearing masks or hoods in public (CHAPTER 160—H. F. No. 138). This ended up being the first of fifteen similar bills to be passed in the United States.

In 1923, Cain unsuccessfully attempted to pass an Equal Rights Amendment to the Minnesota Constitution. In 1973, Cain spoke at the Capitol in favor of the federal Equal Rights Amendment.

Notes

1894 births
1980 deaths
Politicians from Minneapolis
Women state legislators in Minnesota
Minnesota Farmer–Laborites
Members of the Minnesota House of Representatives
20th-century American politicians
20th-century American women politicians